IRL World Rankings may refer to:

IRL Men's World Rankings
IRL Women's World Rankings
IRL Wheelchair World Rankings